1207 Antalya Spor, a.k.a. 1207 Antalyaspor,  is a women's football team based in Antalya playing in the Turkish Women's First Football League. Current chairman of the club is Süleyman Türk.

History 

The women's team was founded as Antalya Yeni Kapıspor in 2006, and started to play in the Women's League. From 2007 until 2012, the team was part of Antalyaspor while they played in the 2011–12 season under the name Medical Park Antalyaspor in line with their sponsor. After three seasons in Women's First League, the team was relegated to the Women's Second League for the 2012–13 season. As a result, Antalyaspor's club management decided to close the women's football branch. The team merged with the other women's football club in Antalya, the Döşemealtı Kırkgöz Gençlik Spor and was renamed 1207 Antalya Muratpaşa Belediye Spor. The municipality of Muratpaşa District sponsors the club.

1207 Antalya Muratpaşa Belediye Spor finished the following two seasons as group leader in the Women's Second League, however, lost the play-off matches and failed so to get promoted to the Women's First League. At the end of the 2014–15 season, they became league champion, and were promoted to the Women's First League again in the 2015–16 season. The team played three seasons in the Women's First League, but at the end of the 2017-18 League season, they were relegated to the Women's Second League.

Between 2016 and 2018, the club was sponsored by the district municipality of Döşemealtı in Antalya. The club was renamed to ""1207 Antalya Döşemealtı Belediye Spor". With the 2018-19 season, the name of the club was changed to "1207 Antalyaspor Kadın Futbol Kulübü" ("1207 Antalyaspor Women's Football Club").

After playing two seasons in the Women's Second League, the team were promoted to the Women's First League againaccording to point average by decision of the Turkish Football Federation (TFF) as the season could not be completed due to the outbreak of the COVID-19 pandemic in Turkey.

Team name history
 2006–2008 Antalya Yeni Kapıspor
 2008–2010 Antalyaspor
 2011–2012 Medical Park Antalyaspor
 2012–2014 1207 Antalyaspor
 2014–2016 1207 Antalya Muratpaşa Belediye Spor
 2016–2018 1207 Antalya Döşemealtı Belediye Spor
 2018–2022 1207 Antalyaspor Kadın Futbol Kulübü
 2022-pres Bitexen 1207 Antalya spor Kadın Futbol Kulübü

Colors 
1207 Antalya Spor's colors are orange and blue.

Stadium 
The team play their home matches at the Zeytinköy Stadium.

Statistics 
.

(1): 3 penalty points deducted
(2): Promoted after the incomplete season by TFF decision according to point average
(3): Eliminated for play-offs
(4): Finished Gr. A 4th, eliminated in the play-offs QF
(5): Season in progress

Current squad 
.

Head coach:  Mevlüt Çırpan

Coaches 
  Hakan İskender Zıvalıoğlu (2010)
  Necdet Erdoğan (2002–2010, 2011)
  Salih Kamil Kabay (2011)
  Hüseyin Türk (2012–2014)
  Özlem Araç (2014–2017)
  Serhat Ürek (2017–2020)
  Cihat Susever (2021-2022)

Kit history

Squad history

References

External links